Olsztyn Voivodeship was an administrative division and unit of local government in Poland in the years 1945–75, and a new territorial division between 1975–1998, superseded by Warmian-Masurian Voivodeship. Its capital city was Olsztyn.

From 1945 to 1975 the Olsztyn Voivodeship covered a larger area.

Major cities and towns (population in 1995)
 Olsztyn (167,400)
 Ostróda (35,000)
 Iława (32,600)
 Kętrzyn (30,300)
 Szczytno (27,500)
 Bartoszyce (26,100)
 Mrągowo (22,500)

See also
 Voivodeships of Poland

Former voivodeships of Poland (1945–1975)
Former voivodeships of Poland (1975–1998)
States and territories established in 1945